Jonas Björkman and Joachim Johansson were the defending champions, but Johansson did not participate this year.

Björkman partnered with Thomas Johansson and won in the final 6–3, 4–6, [10–4], against Christopher Kas and Oliver Marach.

Seeds

Draw

Draw

External links
Draw

Swedish Open
2006 ATP Tour
Swedish